The Mithilalok Foundation is an India-based social service organization that works to promote socio-cultural and economic development of the Mithila region. The flagship programme it has is Paag Bachau Abhiyan (Save the Paag Campaign).

References

Mithila
Organisations based in Bihar
Cultural organisations based in India
2009 establishments in India
Organizations established in 2009